Mark Victor is a screenwriter. He co-wrote Poltergeist (1982), Poltergeist II: The Other Side (1986), Marked for Death (1990), and Cool World (1992).

References

External links
 

Living people
American male screenwriters
Year of birth missing (living people)